Military Base Cepotina (after a nearby hill) or Military Base South is a Serbian Army military base located 5 kilometres south of Bujanovac. It is the largest and the most modern base in the region as regards working and living conditions for soldiers and officers.

Details
The construction works of the base took seven years, and the base opened on 23 November 2009. The total investment size amounted to some 1.7 billion Serbian dinars and is the largest military facility built in Serbia over the past 20 years. The base provides training, logistics, recreation and sport facilities. It also houses a service for maintenance of vehicles, shooting ranges and a heliport. The complex includes a hospital and a dental clinic.

The base covers 35 hectares, with 44 high-construction buildings covering an area of 22,000 square meters. It is able to accommodate almost 1,000 people.

Plans exist on expanding the base in the near future in order to enable preparations of army professionals who are to participate in peace operations. The base is expanding 96 ha of land in its vicinity, which will be used for training.

References

External links
 Serbian Armed Forces

2009 establishments in Serbia
Bujanovac
Military installations established in 2009
Military installations of Serbia